Karen Cook (born 1952/1953) is a British banker. She is also the chair of the investment banking division of Goldman Sachs.

Early life
Karen Cook was born and raised in London, the only child of a car mechanic father.

Career
Cook started her career in the Foreign Office, but found it "too bureaucratic and slow".  She then earned an MBA from Alliance Manchester Business School, and joined First National Bank of Chicago. She moved to Schroders in 1988.

Cook joined Goldman Sachs in 1999, as head of UK investment banking, and became a partner in 2000.

In 2004, she became a director of Tesco.

In 2015, Cook became co-chair of Goldman Sachs' global investment banking division.

Cook has been called the "Queen of M&A", having advised BG Group on its planned £47 billion takeover by Shell.

Personal life
Cook is married to fellow banker Patrick Drayton, and they have six children.

References

Living people
Goldman Sachs people
British women bankers
Bankers from London
Alumni of the Manchester Business School
1950s births